Gabrielė Leščinskaitė (born 25 March 1996) is a Lithuanian biathlete and sport psychologist. She represented Lithuania at the Junior World championships in 2012, 2013, 2014 and 2015, and at the Biathlon World Championships 2015 in Kontiolahti. In 2022 she represented Lithuania at the 2022 Beijing Olympics. 

Leščinskaitė studied psychology at the Mykolas Romeris University. In 2022 she become sport psychologist for Lithuanian youth Olympic team at the 2022 European Youth Summer Olympic Festival.

Biathlon results
All results are sourced from the International Biathlon Union.

World Championships
0 medals

*During Olympic seasons competitions are only held for those events not included in the Olympic program.
**The single mixed relay was added as an event in 2019.

References

External links 
 

1996 births
Living people
Lithuanian female biathletes
People from Pakruojis
Biathletes at the 2022 Winter Olympics
Olympic biathletes of Lithuania
Sports psychologists